"Grampy Can Ya Hear Me" is the fifth episode of the twenty-ninth season of the American animated television series The Simpsons, and the 623rd episode of the series overall. It aired in the United States on Fox on November 5, 2017.

Plot
On Grampa Simpson's birthday, the Simpson family arrives at the Springfield Planetarium. After buying the tickets to which Homer shows the ticket stand girl how he was an astronaut, he tries to weigh himself and is surprised to weigh just 182 pounds. Marge corrects him indicating it’s his weight on the moon while Bart and Lisa watch as a reproduction of Pluto talks about how it lost its status as a planet in the solar system. At the Planetarium show, the family is watching a documentary on the Big Bang, but Grampa escapes after the explosion is shown.

Returning him to the Springfield Retirement Castle, Grampa complains about the music being too low due to his hearing problem. At the home, his companions throw him a little party, asking him to make a wish. The Old Jewish Man gives him a hearing aid, a much appreciated gift as it gives him the hearing back.

Lisa goes to Bart's room to ask him to help her break in to the school to change a homework paper she delivered with the wrong date for when the Big Bang happened. Bart and Lisa break into the school's basement, and change the date, but also discover that Skinner is living in the storage. Skinner tells the story of how his mother kept a big secret from him. When he was young, he applied to Ohio State University to become part of the marching band. However, his mother Agnes Skinner lied about him being accepted.

At home, Grampa hears the dislike of the family for him being there, and says he's leaving the home forever and goes to Springfield Mall, where the shop attendants treats him like an old man, too.

That night, Lisa has a nightmare of the future, becoming president, however being disqualified for cheating on the paper, while Skinner dreams of becoming a drummer, and Grampa goes to the Veterans of Unpopular Wars bar, where he tells the bartender his problems.

Skinner goes to The Ohio State University, where he tells them his story, but gets refused as it’s too late and gets called a loser, convincing him to discuss the matter with his mother.

In class, Lisa confesses to Miss Hoover her trick, but she tells her she knew it. Miss Hoover wants her nicotine gum that Bart stole. It's revealed he gave it to the class pet who darts across the room with his wheel, energized by them and goes to torment Groundskeeper Willie.

At Skinner's house, Seymour tells his mother he knows what she did, but the anger goes away when she cries in front of him for what she did. He agrees to move back in on his conditions, though he has to live with Barney, who moved in his room.

Meanwhile, Homer receives a call from the bar, with the bartender sending Grampa back home and to not send him again there. Upon arriving at the Simpsons' house, Grampa hears the family missing him. However, they're just reading a script written by Lisa and Marge. Grandpa realizes that his family finally cares about him, and the Simpsons join him in a big hug, with Homer holding the episode's script.

At Skinner's house, Seymour and Agnes share TV, happy together. She joins him in watching Game of Thrones and comments on the content of the show.

Before the end credits, Hans Moleman is the main character of a short "Nobody Knows Hans Moleman", where he falls on a manhole and is stood upon by Homer, is trumped by Patty, and scanned by Shauna Chalmers at the supermarket like he's nobody while he just needed his heart pills.

Reception
Dennis Perkins of The A.V. Club gave the episode a B− stating, "So close, this one. ‘Grampy Can Ya Hear Me’ does a lot of little things well while frittering away the overall episode in about six different narrative directions. The script, credited to Bill Odenkirk, is packed with well-observed little character touches and clever side gags, while never settling on one storyline long enough to form the satisfying whole the episode is always on the verge of becoming. Unlike a run-of-the-mill B-minus episode of modern day Simpsons, ‘Grampy Can Ya Hear Me’ stings because of how, with a few adjustments, it could have been a genuinely solid one."

"Grampy Can Ya Hear Me" scored a 1.3 rating with a 5 share and was watched by 2.86 million people, making it Fox's second highest rated show of the night.

References

External links
 

2017 American television episodes
The Simpsons (season 29) episodes
Ohio State University